The Mid-America Geographical Union (MAGU) is the Geographical Union (GU) for rugby union teams playing in Arkansas, Kansas, Missouri, Nebraska, Oklahoma, and parts of Illinois as a member of USA Rugby.

It was originally established in 1975 as the Western Rugby Football Union until becoming the Mid-America Geographical Union in 2013. It is a founding member of USA Rugby.

Division 1
 Kansas City Blues
 St. Louis Bombers

Division 2

Men's Clubs
 Arkansas Gryphons
 Kansas City Blues D2
 Kansas City Rugby
 Little Rock Stormers
 Oklahoma City Crusaders
 St. Louis Royals
 Tulsa Rugby
 Wichita Barbarians

Women's Clubs

 Columbia Black Sheep
 Kansas Bison
 Kansas City Jazz	
 Omaha Goats
 Queen City Chaos
 St. Louis Sabres	
 Wichita Valkyries

Division 3

 Columbia Outlaws
 Mercenaries Rugby
 St. Louis Hornets
 St. Louis Ramblers
 St. Louis Royals D3
 Springfield RFC
 Sunday Morning Rugby

Division 4

Heart of America Conference

 Kansas Jayhawks
 Lincoln
 Nodaway County 
 Northland
 Topeka

Missouri Conference

 Belleville Rowdies
 Franklin County Crimson
 Kohlfeld Scorpions
 St. Louis Crusaders

See also
Missouri Rugby Football Union
Heart of America (college rugby conference)
USA Rugby
Rugby union in the United States

References

External links
USA Rugby Official Site

Rugby union governing bodies in the United States